Rilee Roscoe Rossouw (born 9 October 1989) is a South African cricketer who played for South Africa between 2014 and 2016, before making a return to international cricket in July 2022. In South Africa he played domestic cricket for Knights and Free State before signing a Kolpak deal with Hampshire in England in January 2017. He is a left-hand batsman and a right arm off-spin bowler.

Domestic and T20 franchise cricket
Rossouw made his first-class debut in November 2007 for Free State against Easterns, batting at number three he topscored in the match with 83, an innings that included 13 fours. At the end of his maiden season he made the step-up to franchise cricket playing three Twenty20 matches for the Eagles.

Rossouw was a regular in the Eagles team during the 2008/09 season, in the SuperSport Series he was the team's leading scorer with 765 runs including three centuries. His maiden first-class century came against the Titans in November 2008, he made 106 including 20 boundaries. In the return fixture in March 2009 he scored 109 in a team total of 178, no other batsman passed 16. Again the innings was in vain as the Eagles lost to the league champions. In the one-day format he also scored a maiden century, he struck 131 off 108 balls against the Warriors.

Rossouw scored 1,261 runs at 57.61 in the 2009/10 season, this included a score of 319 off 291 balls against the Titans. The innings was the fastest triple century in South African domestic cricket and included 47 fours and 8 sixes. Alongside Dean Elgar he shared a second wicket partnership of 480 in 84 overs, the largest South African partnership for any wicket.

Rossouw played in the IPL 2011 for Royal Challengers Bangalore and  replaced Nic Maddinson in IPL 2014 for Royal Challengers Bangalore. He was included in the Free State cricket team squad for the 2015 Africa T20 Cup.

Rossouw played in the 2017 Season of the Pakistan Super League for the Quetta Gladiators as a replacement player. Where it was reported that he earned around $370,000. He played for Khulna Titans in BPL 2017.

In October 2018, he was named in the squad for the Rangpur Riders team, following the draft for the 2018–19 Bangladesh Premier League. He was the leading run-scorer for the team in the tournament, with 558 runs in 14 matches. In November 2019, he was selected to play for the Khulna Tigers in the 2019–20 Bangladesh Premier League. In July 2020, he was named in the St Lucia Zouks squad for the 2020 Caribbean Premier League. However, Rossouw was one of five South African cricketers to miss the tournament, after failing to confirm travel arrangements in due time. In November 2020, he was named in the squad for the Melbourne Renegades in the 2019–20 Big Bash League season.

In November 2021, he was selected to play for the Dambulla Giants following the players' draft for the 2021 Lanka Premier League. In April 2022, he was bought by the Oval Invincibles for the 2022 season of The Hundred in England.

In May 2022, he signed with Somerset County Cricket Club for the T20 Blast.

International cricket
While attending Grey College in Bloemfontein Rossouw was selected to represent a South African schools team. He made his debut for South Africa under-19s in the second 'Test' against Bangladesh in December 2007. He also played against India prior to the 2008 U/19 Cricket World Cup. At the World Cup he played all six matches scoring 136 runs at an average of 34.00 as South Africa reached the final.

Rossouw was selected in the South Africa A squad for the tours of Bangladesh and Sri Lanka in 2010, on the latter he scored 131 from 151 balls against Sri Lanka A, sharing century stands with Dean Elgar and Jonathan Vandiar.

He made his One Day International debut against Zimbabwe in August 2014.

He made his Twenty20 International debut for South Africa against Australia on 5 November 2014. He was the man of the match for his score of 78 off 50 balls.

On 5 January 2017, Rossouw signed a Kolpak deal with Hampshire County Cricket Club which made him ineligible to represent South Africa anymore, ending his international career. His last act as an international cricketer before he returned was scoring a 122 at Newlands Cricket Ground where South Africa beat Australia in a 5–0 whitewash, winning the Player of the Series award.

In October 2022, he made his first T20I century against India at Indore.

References

External links

Rilee rossouw : player profile  from RoyalChallengers
 

1989 births
Living people
Cricketers from Bloemfontein
South African cricketers
South Africa One Day International cricketers
South Africa Twenty20 International cricketers
Cricketers at the 2015 Cricket World Cup
Basnahira Cricket Dundee cricketers
Free State cricketers
Hampshire cricketers
Khulna Tigers cricketers
Knights cricketers
Melbourne Renegades cricketers
Multan Sultans cricketers
Quetta Gladiators cricketers
Rangpur Riders cricketers
Royal Challengers Bangalore cricketers
Tshwane Spartans cricketers
Somerset cricketers
Oval Invincibles cricketers
Sydney Thunder cricketers
20th-century South African people
21st-century South African people